What They Did to Princess Paragon is a humor novel by Robert Rodi, which tells the story of what happens when a venerable comic book superheroine is retconned as a lesbian.

Plot summary
Gay comic book creator Brian Parrish is hired by Bang Comics to take over Princess Paragon, a superhero comic book that's been around since the 1940s, but whose sales are slumping badly by the 1990s. Parrish decides to reimagine Princess Paragon as a lesbian, a move which causes quite a bit of excitement and publicity for Bang, but also causes consternation among some of the fan base. One deranged fanboy in particular, Jerome T. Kornacker, is so outraged that his favorite superheroine is being "perverted," that he takes radical steps to stop the change.

Reception
Publishers Weekly considered the novel to be "(t)ightly plotted and consistently amusing", "more farce than satire", and a "campy, breezy read" with "cartoonish" characters. Kirkus Reviews similarly lauded Rodi's plotting, but overall found the book to be "frothy", with "weak" characterization, stereotypes, and a "formula (that) is wearing thin" (noting in particular that this was the third novel by Rodi to feature a kidnapping). Comic Book Resources praised it as "hilarious", "fall-down funny", and "terrific" for its portrayal of fans' "dark suspicions of what editors are really thinking" — and of editors' "nightmare of what hardcore fans are capable of".

Publication history
1994, USA, E. P. Dutton , Pub date 1 May 1994, hardcover
1995, USA, Plume , Pub date 1 May 1995, paperback

References

External links
What They Did to Princess Paragon review at Beek's Books

1994 American novels
American comedy novels
American LGBT novels
Superhero novels
LGBT speculative fiction novels
Dutton Penguin books
1990s LGBT novels